Viksten is a surname. Notable people with the surname include:

 Albert Viksten (1898–1969), Swedish writer
 Daniel Viksten (born 1989), Swedish professional ice hockey player
 Steve Viksten (1960–2014), American television writer and voice actor 

Swedish-language surnames